Bjarne Karsten Vatne (11 October 1926 – 1 October 2009) was a Norwegian politician for the Labour Party.

He served as a deputy representative to the Parliament of Norway from Oslo during the term 1977–1981. In total he met during 16 days of parliamentary session.

References

1926 births
2009 deaths
Deputy members of the Storting
Labour Party (Norway) politicians
Politicians from Oslo